Grizzwald "Grizz" Chapman (born April 16, 1974) is an American television actor best known for his recurring role as Grizz on the NBC series 30 Rock. In his commentary for the episode "Tracy Does Conan", Tracy Morgan revealed that they met when Chapman was working as a bouncer at a strip club. Chapman and fellow actor Kevin Brown were featured in season six on an episode of Hidden Potential.

Chapman received a kidney transplant in July 2010. The actor suffers from severe hypertension and had been undergoing dialysis treatments prior to the transplant.  Due to his battle with his kidney disease, on March 31, 2010, Chapman signed on to be a spokesperson for the National Kidney Foundation.

Chapman has created his own series of YouTube videos known as "Grizz Chroniclez" featuring him in variety sketches. In 2012, he was in production with writers Sam Morgan and Chadwick Prima for his own series called The Lair, based on the comic store Chapman owns in the Bronx.

References

External links

1974 births
Living people
American male television actors
African-American male actors
Kidney transplant recipients
21st-century African-American people
20th-century African-American people